Viscount Margesson, of Rugby in the County of Warwick, is a title in the Peerage of the United Kingdom. It was created on 27 April 1942 for the Conservative politician David Margesson.  the title is held by his grandson, the third Viscount, who succeeded in 2014.

Viscounts Margesson (1942)
(Henry) David Reginald Margesson, 1st Viscount Margesson (1890–1965)
Francis Vere Hampden Margesson, 2nd Viscount Margesson (1922–2014)
Richard Francis David Margesson, 3rd Viscount Margesson (b. 1960)

There is no heir to the viscountcy.

References

Kidd, Charles, Williamson, David (editors). Debrett's Peerage and Baronetage (1990 edition). New York: St Martin's Press, 1990,

External links

Viscountcies in the Peerage of the United Kingdom
Noble titles created in 1942
Noble titles created for UK MPs